The canton of Vence is an administrative division of the Alpes-Maritimes department, southeastern France. Its borders were modified at the French canton reorganisation which came into effect in March 2015. Its seat is in Vence.

It consists of the following communes:

Aiglun 
Ascros
Auvare
Bairols
Beuil
Bézaudun-les-Alpes
Bonson
Bouyon
Châteauneuf-d'Entraunes
Conségudes
Coursegoules
La Croix-sur-Roudoule
Cuébris
Daluis
Entraunes
Les Ferres
Gilette
Guillaumes
Lieuche
Malaussène
Massoins
La Penne
Péone
Pierlas
Pierrefeu
Puget-Rostang
Puget-Théniers
Revest-les-Roches
Rigaud
La Roque-en-Provence
Roquestéron
Saint-Antonin
Saint-Jeannet
Saint-Léger
Saint-Martin-d'Entraunes
Sallagriffon
Sauze
Sigale
Thiéry
Toudon
Touët-sur-Var
La Tour
Tourette-du-Château
Tournefort
Vence
Villars-sur-Var
Villeneuve-d'Entraunes

References

Cantons of Alpes-Maritimes